Dr. K.T. Rabeeullah is a Gulf based Indian businessman, philanthropist and chairman of Shifa Al Jazeera Medical Group. He is also involved in various humanity and charity work.

Rabiullah, owns and operates about 50 hospitals and clinics across the Gulf countries, including 12 medical centers in Saudi Arabia, he shares his highly optimistic vision on the growth prospects of the health sector and the need for building quality health institutions in Saudi Arabia and the Gulf states as well as in India.

Early life 
Dr. K.T. Rabiullah came from Malappuram, Kerala to Saudi Arabia 30 years ago to join a construction company. Like other immigrant workers, he worked long hours for a low salary, which made even basic medicinal care unaffordable. This inspired him to provide quality medical treatment at affordable prices to poor people in the Gulf states. Today, Shifa Al Jazeera Medical Centre, conceived by Rabiullah, has become a huge chain across the region. Rabiullah has received Pravasi Bharatiya Samman  by President of India Mr. Pranab Mukherjee in 2013 in the merit of his Outstanding achievements".

Awards and achievements

References 

Living people
Indian business executives
Year of birth missing (living people)
Recipients of Pravasi Bharatiya Samman